Coagula Art Journal was founded in 1992 by Mat Gleason as a freely distributed contemporary art magazine.  Since its inception, the publication remains free as a PDF download, however readers may still obtain a hard copy via "print on demand".

The bi-coastal publication employs tabloid-style commentary, gossip, and reviews of the contemporary art world, which garnered significant influence in being cited in other major publications.

The magazine has been referred to as "the publication that the art world loves to hate, and loves to read" (Village Voice) and dubbed "The National Enquirer of the Art World" (New York Post).  It has also been described as having "nothing constructive about it and arguably hurtful."

In 1998, Smart Art Press released Most Art Sucks: Five Years of Coagula.

In 1999, Coagula selected Karen Finley as Artist Of The Decade.

On March 16, 2001, Coagula won a free speech lawsuit, brought against the publication by Brooklyn resident Ms. Sheh Zand. Sheh's 1992 lawsuit was over articles appearing in Coagula issues #3 and #4, and was covered by New York Magazine., and the Boston Globe

In February 2011, Mat Gleason, founder of Coagula Art Journal, was interviewed by art critic Brian Sherwin for FineArtViews. Gleason stated that Coagula Art Journal was deeply influenced by the writing style of punk zines. He mentioned that Coagula Art Journal will eventually explore internet radio with the launch of CoaguL.A.radio which will provide coverage of the art world. Gleason also stated that “print is dead” and that future releases of Coagula Art Journal will come in the form of a book rather than of a traditional magazine. The interview between Gleason and Sherwin was featured by the  Huffington Post.

In April 2012, Gleason launched Coagula Curatorial, a contemporary art gallery on Chinatown's historic Chung King Road.  Following the same spirit as the magazine, the gallery has hosted solo shows by contemporary artists such as Karen Finley, Kim Dingle, Gronk, Llyn Foulkes, Sheree Rose and others.  The gallery also utilizes guest curators, who have included other prominent artists in Coagula exhibitions such as:  John Fleck, Diane Gamboa, Germs, Peter Shelton, Gajin Fujita, Sue de Beer, and others.

The 113th issue of Coagula Art Journal, May 2016, is the largest ever printed in the magazine’s 24 year history at 88 pages. This issue highlights Eric Minh Swenson's documentary photographs of Art Stars  –  160 women artists, dealers, and writers in the art scene from New York to California – with an introduction by Mat Gleason.

Contributors (past and present)
 Alan Bamberger
 Jim Caron
 Charlie Finch
 Jeff Gillette
 Mat Gleason
 Gordy Grundy
 Bryan Styble
 Tulsa Kinney

Covers
Coagula has featured interviews and cover stories of such notable artists as Dan Graham, Ad Reinhardt, Gilbert & George, Matthew Barney, Richard Serra, Sue Coe, John Baldessari, Cindy Sherman, and Larry Clark.

Notes

References
 http://nl.newsbank.com/nl-search/we/Archives?p_product=BG&p_theme=bg&p_action=search&p_maxdocs=200&p_topdoc=1&p_text_direct-0=0EC299B79AA0680B&p_field_direct-0=document_id&p_perpage=10&p_sort=YMD_date:D&s_trackval=GooglePM
 http://www.usip.com/articles/Coagula-Art-Journal.pdf
 https://web.archive.org/web/20090820233201/http://www.mollycrabapple.com/content/coagula.html
 https://web.archive.org/web/20110716025122/http://www.seanstarwars.com/coagulatshirthtml.html

External links
 http://www.coagula.com
 http://www.coagula.net
 Editor's Life Unedited
 http://www.artmediaagency.com/40880/le-critique-dart-mat-gleason-ouvre-sa-galerie-a-los-angeles/

Visual arts magazines published in the United States
Free magazines
Magazines established in 1992
Magazines published in California
Downloadable magazines